Ek Daav Dhobi Pachhad  is a Marathi language film released in 2009. The film is directed by Satish Rajwade, story has been written by Girish Girija Joshi, Dialogues by Kiran Yadnyopavit and cinematography by Suresh Deshmane. The movie is produced by Ashok Saraf, Shree Mangesh Films and Zee Talkies. Music of the movie has been given by Vishwajeet-Avinash.

The film stars Ashok Saraf in the lead role of Dadasaheb Dandage, while Mukta Barve, Kishori Shahane, Pushkar Shrotri, Bharat Ganeshpure, Prasad Oak, Madhura Velankar plays the supporting characters in the film. Film started with a story of famous goon from a village, Dada Dandage and later he finds his teenage love. For his love, he starts changing himself and people around him. Meanwhile story takes a different turns and twists to form a wonderful comedy drama. It draws elements from several earlier films, notably, Oscar (1991 film)

Plot
The lead cast of the movie ensembles veteran actor Ashok Saraf, who plays the role of Dadasaheb Dandage, a well-known goon in the village Bhongalpoor. The two main people working for Dada are Bhagwan (Bharath Ganeshpure) and Babu (Pushkar Shrotri). Bhagwan works with soft hands, i.e., with a small talk and money he solves the problems. While Babu acts as killer-person, who uses gun to do his work.

According to Dada, the location for the school for the village is most suitable for his Beer bar, and that`s why he was threatening people who were supporting for school. During the protest, he meets his lost love Hema (Kishori Shahane) and he asks her to get married. But, as a well-educated lady she refuses to marry to a goon. The incident changes Dada`s life, and he quit his all illegal businesses, as well starts learning clean Marathi from Prof Parkhadkar (Subodh Bhave). Meanwhile his daughter Sulakshana (Mukta Barve) lies to him that she is pregnant from the son of Sakha Patil (Uday Sabnis). Therefore Dada asks him to marry his son with Sulakshana, which he refuses to. Later Dada tries to set up the marriage with his accountant Tryambak Joshi (Prasad Oak). But later Tryanbak manages to make Prof Parkhadkar and Sulakshana together, and get engaged with Sayali (Madhura Velankar). During all this Drama Inspector Dhande (Sanjay Mone) is watching all the dada`s activities, as he suspects that Dada is responsible for the theft reports in the village. While Dada is discussing with the Directorate board of Gyanmarg Shikshan Sanstha, Inspector Dhande raids Dada`s home with press and finds out that Dada is actually not responsible, and catches Sakha Patil red-handed. At the end, Dada gets to know that Sayali is the daughter of Hema and him, and he explains Hema how he has changed himself to get her.

Cast 
 Ashok Saraf as Dadasaheb Dandage
 Madhura Velankar as Sayali
 Bharat Ganeshpure as Bhagwan
 Pushkar Shrotri as Babu
 Kishori Shahane as Hema
 Mukta Barve as Sulakshana
 Subodh Bhave as Prof Parkhadkar
 Sanjay Mone as Inspector Dhande
 Sukanya Kulkarni Mrs. Dhande
 Prasad Oak as Tryambak
 Uday Sabnis as Sakha Patil
 Vinay Yedekar as Fransis Tailor
 Kamlakar Satpute as Nanya
 Sandeep Pathak as Baban detective
 Smita Tambe as housemaid Sakhu

Music 
Background Music of the film is given by Vishwajeet- Avinash, while the Title song has been composed and sung by Ajay–Atul. The film features two main tracks, a title track Ek Daav Dhobi Pachhad, while the other song Tujhi Majhi Jodi jamali ga is taken from the famous old movie Maza Pati Karodpati (My husband is billionaire).

References

External links
 

Indian comedy-drama films
2009 films
2000s Marathi-language films
Films directed by Satish Rajwade